Tracy Y. Oliver is an American film and television writer, producer, director, and actress. Oliver originally starred in the web series The Mis-Adventures of Awkward Black Girl, before serving as a staff writer on ABC's The Neighbors and STARZ's Survivor's Remorse.

Oliver has co-written three movies: Barbershop: The Next Cut (2016), Girls Trip (2017), and Little (2019), with Girls Trip making her the first African-American woman to write a film that grossed over US$100 million. Oliver also created and wrote the BET television series First Wives Club and wrote the screenplay to the 2019 film adaptation of The Sun Is Also a Star. Oliver also runs a production company, Tracy Yvonne Productions.

Career 
Oliver started her career shortly after attending Stanford University and USC Film School, where she double majored in American studies and drama. along with creating the black theater company Black Stage. She portrayed Nina, the antagonist to Issa Rae's "J", in Rae's 2011-12 web series The Mis-Adventures of Awkward Black Girl. In addition to acting in Awkward Black Girl, Oliver also served as a writer and producer. Oliver wrote and circulated a spec script for a movie called Marriage Is for White People. The script got the attention of Dan Fogelman, who then hired her as a staff writer on ABC's The Neighbors. Oliver then became a staff writer and story editor on STARZ's Survivor's Remorse.

Oliver partnered with Black-ish creator Kenya Barris to write the comedies Barbershop: The Next Cut (2016), starring Ice Cube and Cedric the Entertainer. The movie received positive reviews and grossed $55 million on a budget of $20 million. Oliver and Barris then co-wrote Girls Trip (2017), starring Queen Latifah, Regina Hall, Jada Pinkett Smith, and Tiffany Haddish. Girls Trip received positive reviews and grossed over $140 million worldwide, making Oliver the first African-American woman to write a film that grossed over $100 million.

She re-teamed with Barris on the 2019 film Little, which he co-produced and she co-wrote; she also received a "story by" credit. She also wrote the screenplay of the 2019 film The Sun Is Also a Star, based on Nicola Yoon's novel.

Oliver also created and wrote the BET television series First Wives Club. She directed an episode of the show, making her directorial debut.

Oliver serves as creator, writer, and executive producer of the Amazon Studios half-hour television series Harlem, a single camera comedy starring Meagan Good, Grace Byers, Jerrie Johnson and Shoniqua Shandai. Malcolm D. Lee, who directed Girl's Trip, directed the first two episodes.

A follow-up to Girl's Trip is reportedly in the works, with Oliver having written a treatment for it. Oliver has also been reported to be writing a reboot to the 1995 film Clueless.

Oliver was included on the 2020 Ebony Power 100 List. More recently, she signed an overall deal with Apple.

Filmography

Television

Film

Notes

References

External links

21st-century African-American women
21st-century American women
American screenwriters
American television writers
American television producers
American women television producers
American women television writers
Living people
Place of birth missing (living people)
Year of birth missing (living people)